Centerview Partners is an American independent investment banking firm.  Centerview operates primarily as an investment banking advisory firm. Centerview has 60 partners and 300 professionals with expertise across a wide range of industries, geographies, transaction structures and sizes. 

Founded in 2006 by a group of senior investment bankers, the firm is headquartered in New York City with offices in London, Paris, Chicago, Los Angeles, Palo Alto and San Francisco.

History
Centerview was founded in July 2006 and is currently led by, Blair Effron, former Vice Chairman of UBS AG, and Robert Pruzan, former CEO of Dresdner Kleinwort Wasserstein North America and President of Wasserstein Perella & Co. Additional Centerview co-founders included Stephen Crawford, former co-president at Morgan Stanley, and Adam Chinn, former partner at Wachtell Lipton. James M. Kilts former CEO of Gillette, heads the firm's private equity fund. In 2010, Robert E. Rubin, former U.S. Secretary of the Treasury, joined the firm as Counselor. In 2019, Rahm Emanuel joined the firm to launch the Chicago office.

In 2020, achieved record revenue of $1.3 billion, more than double the revenue achieved five years prior. In 2020, the firm was rated "No. 1 Investment Bank to Work For" by Vault for the second year in a row.

The firm is routinely cited as one of the best-paying firms in the industry and has the highest pay for first-year analysts.

Management
Prior to co-founding Centerview, Effron was Group Vice Chairman of UBS AG and a member of the Board of UBS Investment Bank, where he also sat on several management committees and advised Gillette on its $57 billion sale to Procter & Gamble, which was the largest M&A transaction of 2005. In 2006, Effron announced he was leaving UBS to form a new boutique investment banking firm.

Prior to co-founding Centerview, Pruzan was Head of Global Investment Banking and CEO of North America at Dresdner Kleinwort Wasserstein and President of Wasserstein Perella & Co. He is a former member of McKinsey & Company where he specialized in strategic consulting for consumer products companies and financial institutions.

Recent activities
Centerview has advised on many of the largest and most complex corporate situations and transactions, including:
General Electric sale of $200 billion of financial assets 
Sprint Corporation Independent Transaction Committee on proposed $146 billion merger of Sprint and T-Mobile
Qualcomm defense of Broadcom Corporation $130 billion hostile takeover 
21st Century Fox's $71.3 billion transactions with The Walt Disney Company
Pfizer announced joint venture with GlaxoSmithKline, its $14 billion acquisition of Medivation and $5.2 billion acquisition of Anacor
AstraZeneca $39 billion acquisition of Alexion Pharmaceuticals
GW Pharmaceuticals involved sale of Jazz Pharmaceuticals for a proposed $7.2 billion on February 3, 2021, still pending
Walgreens Boots Alliance transaction for the sale of Alliance Healthcare businesses to AmerisourceBergen valued at $6.5 billion that is still pending
Duke Energy in the sale of the minority interest of Duke Energy Indiana to GIC (Singaporean sovereign wealth fund) for $2.05 billion 
Honeywell in connection with the resolution of claims with Garrett Motion in connection with its court-supervised Chapter 11 proceedings valued at $1.2 billion
Dentsply Sirona transaction of $1.04 billion for the acquisition of Byte
Arvelle Therapeutics sale for $960 million to Angelini
DuPont sale of Clean Technologies to an international private equity consortium consisting of BroadPeak Global LP, Asia Green Fund and The Saudi Arabian Industrial Investments Company of The Saudi Industrial Development Fund (SIDF) for $510 million still pending
Honeywell sale of Original Muck Boot, Xtratuf, Ranger, NEOS and Servus to Rocky Brands for $230 Million still pending
Tradeweb acquisition of the Nasdaq U.S. Fixed income electronic trading platform for $190 million 
Amphenol sale of MTS Test & Simulation to Illinois Tool Works the transaction is still pending
R1 RCM conversion agreement with Ascension (company) and TowerBrook Capital Partners still pending
Mondelez International acquisition of Hu Products still pending
Pacific Gas and Electric Company as financial advisor and investment banker to the Official Committee of Unsecured Creditors (the “UCC”) which included indenture trustees, trade creditors, contract counterparties, the International Brotherhood of Electrical Workers, Local 1245 and the Pension Benefit Guaranty Corporation in connection with PG&E's chapter 11 Plan of Reorganization with a value of $25.5 billion
Immunomedics advisor for its sale to Gilead Sciences for $21 billion
MyoKardia sale to Bristol Myers Squibb for $13.1 billion
MultiPlan sale to Churchill Capital Corp III for $11 billion
Grubhub merger with Just Eat Takeaway for 7.5 billion 
Eaton Vance advisor for its sale to Morgan Stanley for $7 billion
Momenta Pharmaceuticals sale to Johnson & Johnson for $6.5 billion
Forty Seven sale to Gilead Sciences for $4.9 billion
Waste Management (corporation) sale to Advanced Disposal for $4.6 billion
PepsiCo acquisition of Rockstar (drink) for $4.5 billion
Anixter sale to WESCO International for $4.5 billion
Engie Advisor to the board of Engie on the disposal of its 29.9% stake in Suez of a value of €3.4 billion
Principia Biopharma sale to Sanofi for $3.4 billion
Endurance International Group sale to Clearlake Capital for $3.0 billion
McDermott International financial advisor to an ad hoc group of secured lenders under McDermott's $2.2bn term loan facility and $800mm funded superpriority term loan facility in connection with McDermott's fully consensual prepackaged chapter 11 restructuring value the transaction at $3.0 billion
VelosBio sale to Merck for $2.75 Billion
Simmons Bedding Company Financial advisor to the Ad Hoc group of Term Loan Lenders under Serta Simmons' $1.9 billion First Lien Term Loan and $450 million Second Lien Term Loan with the transaction valued at $2.35 billion
Sasol sale of 50% of Lake Charles Chemicals Project Base Chemicals to LyondellBasell for $2 billion
Eidos Therapeutics sale to BridgeBio Pharma for $1.9 billion
Pionyr Immunotherapeutics sale to Gilead Sciences for $1.74 billion
LPL Financial acquisition of Waddell & Reed Wealth Management for $1.7 billion
Amphenol acquisition of MTS Systems Corporation for $1.7 billion
Versant Health sale to MetLife for $1.7 billion
CBS Corporation acquisition and forming of ViacomCBS valued at $48 billion
FIS (company) acquisition of Worldpay, Inc. for $43 billion
Thomson Reuters Financial advisor to Thomson Reuters, together with private equity funds affiliated with The Blackstone Group, on the sale of Refinitiv to the London Stock Exchange Group for $27 billion
Mylan Financial advisor to Mylan on its combination with Upjohn in an all-stock Reverse Morris Trust transaction
Tiffany & Co. sale to LVMH for $17 Billion
Array Biopharma sale to Pfizer for $11.8 billion
Apergy Corp Financial advisor to Apergy on its combination with Ecolab's Upstream Energy business, Nalco Champion, in an all-stock, tax-free Reverse Morris Trust transaction
Riverstone Holdings Exclusive financial advisor to Pattern Energy and Riverstone Holdings in connection with CPP Investment Board with the transaction valued at $6.1 billion
Auris Health sale to Johnson & Johnson for $5.8 billion
Hasbro acquisition of Entertainment One for £3.3 billion
Gilead Sciences acquisition of Galapagos NV for $5.1 billion
Spark Therapeutics sale to Hoffmann-La Roche for $4.8 billion
Anixter sale to Clayton, Dubilier & Rice for $4.3 billion
Acosta Sales & Marketing Exclusive financial advisor to an ad hoc group of Acosta's lenders around its conversion of $3 billion of long—term debt into equity, and a commitment of $250 million in new equity valued at $3.3 billion
Audentes Therapeutics sale to Astellas Pharma for $3.0 billion
Exact Sciences (company) acquisition of Genomic Health for a transaction value of $2.8 billion
Cision on its sale to an affiliate of Platinum Equity for $2.7 billion
Campbell Soup Company sale of Arnott's Biscuits and certain Campbell's international operations to KKR for $2.2 billion
Peloton Therapeutics sale to Merck for up to $2.2 billion
Coty Inc. Exclusive independent financial advisor to the Special Committee of the Board of Directors of Coty in connection with JAB Holding Company tender offer of $1.75 billion
McDermott International Financial advisor to an ad hoc lender group of McDermott's term loan on an agreement for up to $1.7 billion of new financing
Harry's sale to Edgewell Personal Care for $1.4 billion
Catalent acquisition of Paragon Bioservices from NewSpring Health Capital and Camden Partners financed by stock given to Leonard Green & Partners and the total value of $1.2 billion
Ocado Group joint venture with Marks & Spencer in a transaction of £750 million
Western Union sale of Speedpay to ACI Worldwide for $750 Million
I Squared Capital and Cube Hydro Partner sale of Cube Hydro to Ontario Power Generation for $1.1 billion
Sprint Corporation Financial advisor to the Independent Transaction Committee of the Board of Directors of Sprint on its merger with T-Mobile valued at $146 billion
21st Century Fox Financial advisor to 21st Century Fox on its sale to The Walt Disney Company, as well as the spin off, immediately prior to the sale, of Fox Broadcasting network and stations, Fox News Channel, Fox Business Network, FS1, FS2 and Big Ten Network to its shareholders at a value of $85 billion
Express Scripts sale to Cigna for $67 billion
Thomson Reuters sale of a 55% majority stake in its Financial & Risk business to, The Blackstone Group
21st Century Fox sale of its 39.14% stake in Sky Group to Comcast for £11.6 billion
News Corporation Financial advisor to News Corp. on its separation of its publishing and media and entertainment businesses into two distinct publicly traded companies valued transaction of 9 billion
GMAC ResCap Advisor to ResCap in its chapter 11 restructuring with $15.3 billion of indebtedness, an engagement which has included raising $1.7bn in debtor-in-possession financing and conducting two concurrent asset sales including: (i) ResCap's Servicing and Origination Platform for $3.0bn; and (ii) a portfolio of domestic whole loans for $1.5bn transaction of 15.3 billion
Clearwire Corporation involved in the Sprint 50.8% stake in the company it didn't own in a possible transaction of $14 billion
Avon Products and Coty Inc. $12.9 billion in a hostile takeover
Pfizer sale of its Pediatric Nutrition Business to Nestlé for $11.85 billion
Conagra Brands acquisition of Ralcorp for $6.8 billion
Exclusive financial advisor to Walgreens Boots Alliance in a unique two-step transaction with Walgreens to create the first global pharmacy-led, health and wellbeing enterprise with the first step worth $6.7 billion and the other left $30 billion
Cisco Systems acquisition of NDS Group know is called Cisco Videoscape or Synamedia Ltd. for $5 billion
Ameristar Casinos} sale to Pinnacle Entertainment for $2.8 billion
Alcatel-Lucent in connection with raising a €2.0bn multi-tranche, senior secured credit facility for €2.0 billion
Molycorp Chapter 11 bankruptcy value of $1.6 billion
Midstates Petroleum Company, Inc. Chapter 11 bankruptcy
Diamond Resorts acquisition with help of Apollo Global Management for a value of $2.5 billion
SABMiller sale to AB InBev for £79 billion
Qualcomm acquisition of NXP Semiconductors with a value of $49 billion
Conagra Brands acquisition of Pinnacle Foods for $10.7 billion
General Electric Company IPO of Baker Hughes for $32 billion in IPO
Caesars Entertainment Corp and Caesars Acquisition Company merge to create Harrah's Entertainment in a merger valued at $17.2 billion
Johnson Controls merger with Tyco International in a merger valued at $16.5 billion
EverBank sale to (Teachers Insurance and Annuity Association of America) for $2.5 billion
DreamWorks Animation sale to Comcast for $3.8 billion
Pfizer acquisition of Medivation for $14 billion
TerraForm Global Chapter 11 restructuring with issues of SunEdison of $12.6 billion
Mylan acquisition of Meda AB for $10 billion
Peabody Energy Chapter 11 restructuring with value of $8.8 billion
Henderson Group merger with Janus Capital Group with a great value of $6 billion

See also
 List of investment banks
 Boutique investment bank

References

External links
Centerview Partners. (Company website)

Investment banks in the United States
Financial services companies established in 2006
Banks established in 2006
Private equity firms of the United States
Companies based in New York City